Ten countries in the world has nuclear weapons successful detonation of nuclear weapons. Five are considered to be atomic bombs under the terms of the Treaty on the Non-Proliferation of Nuclear Weapons (NPT). In order of acquisition of nuclear weapons, these are the United States, Russia (the successor of the former Soviet Union), the United Kingdom, France, and China. Of these, the three NATO members, the UK, US, and France, are sometimes termed the P3.

Other states that possess nuclear weapons are India, Pakistan, and North Korea. Since the NPT entered into force in 1970, these three states were not parties to the Treaty and have conducted overt nuclear tests. North Korea had been a party to the NPT but withdrew in 2003.

Israel is also generally understood to have nuclear weapons, but does not acknowledge it, maintaining a policy of deliberate ambiguity. Israel is estimated to possess somewhere between 75 and 400 nuclear warheads. One possible motivation for nuclear ambiguity is deterrence with minimum political cost.

States that formerly possessed nuclear weapons are South Africa (developed nuclear weapons but then disassembled its arsenal before joining the NPT) and the former Soviet republics of Belarus, Kazakhstan, and Ukraine, whose weapons were transferred to Russia.

According to Stockholm International Peace Research Institute (SIPRI), the worldwide total inventory of nuclear weapons as of 2021 stood at 13,080. Around 30% of these are deployed with operational forces, and more than 90% are owned by either Russia or the United States.

Statistics and force configuration

The following is a list of states that have admitted the possession of nuclear weapons or are presumed to possess them, the approximate number of warheads under their control, and the year they tested their first weapon and their force configuration. This list is informally known in global politics as the "Nuclear Club". With the exception of Russia and the United States (which have subjected their nuclear forces to independent verification under various treaties) these figures are estimates, in some cases quite unreliable estimates. In particular, under the Strategic Offensive Reductions Treaty thousands of Russian and U.S. nuclear warheads are inactive in stockpiles awaiting processing. The fissile material contained in the warheads can then be recycled for use in nuclear reactors.

From a high of 70,300 active weapons in 1986,  there are approximately 3,750 active nuclear warheads and 13,890 total nuclear warheads in the world. Many of the decommissioned weapons were simply stored or partially dismantled, not destroyed.

It is also noteworthy that since the dawn of the Atomic Age, the delivery methods of most states with nuclear weapons has evolved—with some achieving a nuclear triad, while others have consolidated away from land and air deterrents to submarine-based forces.

Recognized nuclear-weapon states

These five states are known to have detonated a nuclear explosive before 1 January 1967 and are thus nuclear weapons states under the Treaty on the Non-Proliferation of Nuclear Weapons. They also happen to be the UN Security Council's (UNSC) permanent members with veto power on UNSC resolutions.

United States

The United States developed the first nuclear weapons during World War II in cooperation with the United Kingdom and Canada as part of the Manhattan Project, out of the fear that Nazi Germany would develop them first. It tested the first nuclear weapon on 16 July 1945 ("Trinity") at 5:30 am, and remains the only country to have used nuclear weapons in war, devastating the Japanese cities of Hiroshima and Nagasaki. The project expenditure through 1 October 1945 was reportedly $1.845-$2 billion, in nominal terms, roughly 0.8 percent of the US GDP in 1945 and equivalent to about $29 billion in 2020 money.

It was the first nation to develop the hydrogen bomb, testing an experimental prototype in 1952 ("Ivy Mike") and a deployable weapon in 1954 ("Castle Bravo"). Throughout the Cold War it continued to modernize and enlarge its nuclear arsenal, but from 1992 on has been involved primarily in a program of stockpile stewardship. The U.S. nuclear arsenal contained 31,175 warheads at its Cold War height (in 1966). During the Cold War, the United States built approximately 70,000 nuclear warheads, more than all other nuclear-weapon states combined.

Russia (successor to the Soviet Union)

The Soviet Union tested its first nuclear weapon ("RDS-1") in 1949. This crash project was developed partially with information obtained via espionage during and after World War II. The Soviet Union was the second nation to have developed and tested a nuclear weapon. The direct motivation for Soviet weapons development was to achieve a balance of power during the Cold War. It tested its first megaton-range hydrogen bomb ("RDS-37") in 1955. The Soviet Union also tested the most powerful explosive ever detonated by humans, ("Tsar Bomba"), with a theoretical yield of 100 megatons, intentionally reduced to 50 when detonated. After its dissolution in 1991, the Soviet weapons entered officially into the possession of the Russian Federation. The Soviet nuclear arsenal contained some 45,000 warheads at its peak (in 1986); the Soviet Union built about 55,000 nuclear warheads since 1949.

United Kingdom

The United Kingdom tested its first nuclear weapon ("Hurricane") in 1952. The UK had provided considerable impetus and initial research for the early conception of the atomic bomb, aided by Austrian, German and Polish physicists working at British universities who had either fled or decided not to return to Nazi Germany or Nazi controlled territories. The UK collaborated closely with the United States and Canada during the Manhattan Project, but had to develop its own method for manufacturing and detonating a bomb as U.S. secrecy grew after 1945. The United Kingdom was the third country in the world, after the United States and the Soviet Union, to develop and test a nuclear weapon. Its programme was motivated to have an independent deterrent against the Soviet Union, while also maintaining its status as a great power. It tested its first hydrogen bomb in 1957 (Operation Grapple), making it the third country to do so after the United States and Soviet Union.

The British Armed Forces maintained a fleet of V bomber strategic bombers and ballistic missile submarines (SSBNs) equipped with nuclear weapons during the Cold War. The Royal Navy currently maintains a fleet of four  ballistic missile submarines equipped with Trident II missiles.

France

France tested its first nuclear weapon in 1960 ("Gerboise Bleue"), based mostly on its own research. It was motivated by the Suez Crisis diplomatic tension in relation to both the Soviet Union and its allies, the United States and United Kingdom. It was also relevant to retain great power status, alongside the United Kingdom, during the post-colonial Cold War (see: Force de frappe). France tested its first hydrogen bomb in 1968 ("Opération Canopus"). After the Cold War, France has disarmed 175 warheads with the reduction and modernization of its arsenal that has now evolved to a dual system based on submarine-launched ballistic missiles (SLBMs) and medium-range air-to-surface missiles (Rafale fighter-bombers). However, new nuclear weapons are in development and reformed nuclear squadrons were trained during Enduring Freedom operations in Afghanistan. 

France acceded to the Nuclear Non-Proliferation Treaty in 1992. In January 2006, President Jacques Chirac stated a terrorist act or the use of weapons of mass destruction against France would result in a nuclear counterattack. In February 2015, President François Hollande stressed the need for a nuclear deterrent in "a dangerous world". He also detailed the French deterrent as "fewer than 300" nuclear warheads, three sets of 16 submarine-launched ballistic missiles and 54 medium-range air-to-surface missiles and urged other states to show similar transparency.

China

China tested its first nuclear weapon device ("596") in 1964 at the Lop Nur test site. The weapon was developed as a deterrent against both the United States and the Soviet Union. Two years later, China had a fission bomb capable of being put onto a nuclear missile. It tested its first hydrogen bomb ("Test No. 6") in 1967, 32 months after testing its first nuclear weapon (the shortest fission-to-fusion development known in history). China is the only NPT nuclear-weapon state to give an unqualified negative security assurance with its "no first use" policy. China acceded to the Nuclear Non-Proliferation Treaty in 1992. As of 2016, China fielded SLBMs onboard its JL-2 submarines. As of May 2021, China has an estimated total inventory of 350 warheads.

States declaring possession of nuclear weapons

India

India is not a party to the Nuclear Non-Proliferation Treaty. Indian officials rejected the NPT in the 1960s on the grounds that it created a world of nuclear "haves" and "have-nots", arguing that it unnecessarily restricted "peaceful activity" (including "peaceful nuclear explosives"), and that India would not accede to international control of their nuclear facilities unless all other countries engaged in unilateral disarmament of their own nuclear weapons. The Indian position has also asserted that the NPT is in many ways a neo-colonial regime designed to deny security to post-colonial powers. 

The country tested what is called a "peaceful nuclear explosive" in 1974 (which became known as "Smiling Buddha"). The test was the first test developed after the creation of the NPT, and created new questions about how civilian nuclear technology could be diverted secretly to weapons purposes (dual-use technology). India's secret development caused great concern and anger particularly from nations that had supplied its nuclear reactors for peaceful and power generating needs, such as Canada. After its 1974 test, India maintained that its nuclear capability was primarily "peaceful", but between 1988 and 1990 it apparently weaponized two dozen nuclear weapons for delivery by air. In 1998 India tested weaponized nuclear warheads ("Operation Shakti"), including a thermonuclear device. India adopted a "no first use" policy in 1998.

In July 2005, U.S. President George W. Bush and Indian Prime Minister Manmohan Singh announced plans to conclude an Indo-US civilian nuclear agreement. This came to fruition through a series of steps that included India's announced plan to separate its civil and military nuclear programs in March 2006, the passage of the India–United States Civil Nuclear Agreement by the U.S. Congress in December 2006, the conclusion of a U.S.–India nuclear cooperation agreement in July 2007, approval by the IAEA of an India-specific safeguards agreement, agreement by the Nuclear Suppliers Group to a waiver of export restrictions for India, approval by the U.S. Congress and culminating in the signature of U.S.–India agreement for civil nuclear cooperation in October 2008. The U.S. State Department said it made it "very clear that we will not recognize India as a nuclear-weapon state". The United States is bound by the Hyde Act with India and may cease all cooperation with India if India detonates a nuclear explosive device. The US had further said it is not its intention to assist India in the design, construction or operation of sensitive nuclear technologies through the transfer of dual-use items. In establishing an exemption for India, the Nuclear Suppliers Group reserved the right to consult on any future issues which might trouble it. As of May 2021, India was estimated to have a stockpile of around 160 warheads.

Pakistan

Pakistan is also not a party to the Nuclear Non-Proliferation Treaty. Pakistan covertly developed nuclear weapons over decades, beginning in the late 1970s. Pakistan first delved into nuclear power after the establishment of its first nuclear power plant near Karachi with equipment and materials supplied mainly by western nations in the early 1970s. Pakistani Prime Minister Zulfiqar Ali Bhutto promised in 1971 that if India could build nuclear weapons then Pakistan would too, according to him: "We will develop Nuclear stockpiles, even if we have to eat grass."

It is believed that Pakistan has possessed nuclear weapons since the mid-1980s. The United States continued to certify that Pakistan did not possess such weapons until 1990, when sanctions were imposed under the Pressler Amendment, requiring a cutoff of U.S. economic and military assistance to Pakistan. In 1998, Pakistan conducted its first six nuclear tests at the Ras Koh Hills in response to the five tests conducted by India a few weeks before.

In 2004, the Pakistani metallurgist Abdul Qadeer Khan, a key figure in Pakistan's nuclear weapons program, confessed to heading an international black market ring involved in selling nuclear weapons technology. In particular, Khan had been selling gas centrifuge technology to North Korea, Iran, and Libya. Khan denied complicity by the Pakistani government or Army, but this has been called into question by journalists and IAEA officials, and was later contradicted by statements from Khan himself.

As of early 2013, Pakistan was estimated to have had a stockpile of around 140 warheads, and in November 2014 it was projected that by 2020 Pakistan would have enough fissile material for 200 warheads.

North Korea

North Korea was a party to the Nuclear Non-Proliferation Treaty, but announced a withdrawal on 10 January 2003, after the United States accused it of having a secret uranium enrichment program and cut off energy assistance under the 1994 Agreed Framework. In February 2005, North Korea claimed to possess functional nuclear weapons, though their lack of a test at the time led many experts to doubt the claim. In October 2006, North Korea stated that, in response to growing intimidation by the United States, it would conduct a nuclear test to confirm its nuclear status. North Korea reported a successful nuclear test on 9 October 2006 (see 2006 North Korean nuclear test). Most U.S. intelligence officials believed that the test was probably only partially successful with a yield of less than a kiloton. North Korea conducted a second, higher-yield test on 25 May 2009 (see 2009 North Korean nuclear test) and a third test with still-higher yield on 12 February 2013 (see 2013 North Korean nuclear test).

North Korea claimed to have conducted its first hydrogen-bomb test on 5 January 2016, though measurements of seismic disturbances indicate that the detonation was not consistent with a hydrogen bomb. On 3 September 2017, North Korea detonated a device, which caused a magnitude 6.1 tremor, consistent with a low-powered thermonuclear detonation; NORSAR estimates the yield at 250 kilotons of TNT. In 2018, North Korea announced a halt in nuclear weapons tests and made a conditional commitment to denuclearisation of the Korean Peninsula; however, in December 2019, it indicated it no longer considered itself bound by the moratorium.

Kim Jong-un officially declared North Korea a nuclear weapons state during a speech on 9 September 2022, the country's foundation day.

States indicated to possess nuclear weapons

Israel

Israel is widely believed to have been the sixth country in the world to develop nuclear weapons, but it has not acknowledged its nuclear forces. It had "rudimentary, but deliverable," nuclear weapons available as early as 1966. Israel is not a party to the NPT. Israel engages in strategic ambiguity, saying it would not be the first country to "introduce" nuclear weapons into the region, but refusing to otherwise confirm or deny a nuclear weapons program or arsenal. This policy of "nuclear opacity" has been interpreted as an attempt to get the benefits of deterrence with a minimal political cost. Due to a US ban on funding countries that have weapons of mass destruction, Israel would lose around $2 billion a year in military and other aid from the US if it admitted to possessing nuclear weapons.

According to the Natural Resources Defense Council and the Federation of American Scientists, Israel likely possesses around 80–400 nuclear weapons. The Stockholm International Peace Research Institute estimates that Israel has approximately 80 intact nuclear weapons, of which 50 are for delivery by Jericho II medium-range ballistic missiles and 30 are gravity bombs for delivery by aircraft. SIPRI also reports that there was renewed speculation in 2012 that Israel may also have developed nuclear-capable submarine-launched cruise missiles.

Launch authority

The decision to use nuclear weapons is always restricted to a single person or small group of people. The United States and France require their respective presidents to approve the use of nuclear weapons. In the US, the Presidential Emergency Satchel is always handled by a nearby aide unless the President is near a command center. The decision rests with the Prime Minister in the United Kingdom. Information from China is unclear, but "the launch of nuclear weapons is commonly believed to rest with the Central Military Commission of the Chinese Communist Party." Russia grants such power to the President but may also require approval from the Minister of Defence and the Chief of the General Staff; weapons can also be launched using the automated Dead Hand system. The Supreme Commander of the Armed Forces has authority in North Korea. India, Pakistan and Israel have committees for such a decision.

Nuclear weapons sharing

Under NATO nuclear weapons sharing, the United States has provided nuclear weapons for Belgium, Germany, Italy, the Netherlands, and Turkey to deploy and store. This involves pilots and other staff of the "non-nuclear" NATO states practicing, handling, and delivering the U.S. nuclear bombs, and adapting non-U.S. warplanes to deliver U.S. nuclear bombs. However, since all U.S. nuclear weapons are protected with Permissive Action Links, the host states cannot easily arm the bombs without authorization codes from the U.S. Department of Defense. Former Italian President Francesco Cossiga acknowledged the presence of U.S. nuclear weapons in Italy. U.S. nuclear weapons were also deployed in Canada as well as Greece from 1963 to 1984. However, Canada withdrew three of the four nuclear-capable weapons systems by 1972. The single system retained, the AIR-2 Genie, had a yield of 1.5 kilotons, was designed to strike enemy aircraft as opposed to ground targets, and might not have qualified as a weapon of mass destruction given its limited yield.

Members of the Non-Aligned Movement have called on all countries to "refrain from nuclear sharing for military purposes under any kind of security arrangements." The Institute of Strategic Studies Islamabad (ISSI) has criticized the arrangement for allegedly violating Articles I and II of the NPT, arguing that "these Articles do not permit the NWS to delegate the control of their nuclear weapons directly or indirectly to others." NATO has argued that the weapons' sharing is compliant with the NPT because "the U.S. nuclear weapons based in Europe are in the sole possession and under constant and complete custody and control of the United States."

, the United States maintained around 150 nuclear weapons in Europe, as reflected in the accompanying table.

States formerly possessing nuclear weapons
Nuclear weapons have been present in many nations, often as staging grounds under control of other powers. However, in only one instance has a nation given up nuclear weapons after being in full control of them. The fall of the Soviet Union left several former Soviet republics in physical possession of nuclear weapons, though not operational control which was dependent on Russian-controlled electronic Permissive Action Links and the Russian command and control system.

South Africa

South Africa produced six nuclear weapons in the 1980s, but dismantled them in the early 1990s.

In 1979, there was a detection of a putative covert nuclear test in the Indian Ocean, called the Vela incident. It has long been speculated that it was a test by Israel, in collaboration with and with the support of South Africa, though this has never been confirmed. South Africa could not have constructed such a nuclear bomb until November 1979, two months after the "double flash" incident.

South Africa acceded to the Nuclear Non-Proliferation Treaty in 1991.

Former Soviet republics

 Belarus had 81 single warhead missiles stationed on its territory after the Soviet Union collapsed in 1991. They were all transferred to Russia by 1996. In May 1992, Belarus acceded to the Nuclear Non-Proliferation Treaty (NPT). On 28 February 2022, Belarus held a constitutional referendum, in which it dropped its "Non-nuclear" status, in light of Belarusian involvement in the 2022 Russian invasion of Ukraine. In October 2022 Russia announced plans to transfer dual-capable Iskander-M missile systems, although with conventional warheads, and giving Belorussian Su-25s the "technical ability to carry nuclear weapons."
 Kazakhstan had 1,400 Soviet-era nuclear weapons on its territory and transferred them all to Russia by 1995, after Kazakhstan acceded to the NPT. 
 Ukraine had "as many as 3,000" nuclear weapons deployed on its territory when it became independent from the Soviet Union in 1991, equivalent to the third-largest nuclear arsenal in the world. At the time Ukraine acceded to the NPT in December 1994, Ukraine had agreed to dispose of all nuclear weapons within its territory. The warheads were removed from Ukraine by 1996 and disassembled in Russia. Despite Russia's subsequent and internationally disputed annexation of Crimea in 2014, Ukraine reaffirmed its 1994 decision to accede to the Nuclear Non-Proliferation Treaty as a non-nuclear-weapon state.

In connection with their accession to the NPT, all three countries received assurances that their sovereignty, independence, and territorial integrity would be respected, as stated in the Budapest Memorandum on Security Assurances. This agreement has been violated by Russia since the Russo-Ukrainian War began in 2014, during which Russia annexed Crimea, occupied Eastern Ukraine, and in 2022, invaded the remainder of the country with no direct response.

Stationed countries
Up until the 1990s the U.S. had stationed nuclear weapons outside of its territories and sharing countries.

South Korea

Taiwan

Taiwan was developing capacities to construct nuclear weapons up until the 1970s. During that time the United States stationed some of their arsenal in Taiwan.

Japan

After World War II the U.S. had nuclear weapons stationed in Japan until the 1970s.

See also

 Comprehensive Nuclear-Test-Ban Treaty
 Doomsday Clock
 Historical nuclear weapons stockpiles and nuclear tests by country
 International Campaign to Abolish Nuclear Weapons
 No first use
 Nuclear disarmament
 Nuclear latency
 Nuclear power
Nuclear program of Iran
 Nuclear proliferation
 Nuclear terrorism
 Nuclear warfare
 Nuclear-weapon-free zone

Notes

References

Bibliography

 
 .
 Philipp C. Bleek, “When Did (and Didn’t) States Proliferate? Chronicling the Spread of Nuclear Weapons,” Discussion Paper (Cambridge, MA: Project on Managing the Atom, Belfer Center for Science and International Affairs, June 2017).

External links
 The Nuclear Weapon Archive
 Nuclear Notebook from Bulletin of the Atomic Scientists
 U.S. Nuclear Weapons in Europe: A review of post-Cold War policy, force levels, and war planning NRDC, February 2005
 Tracking Nuclear Proliferation Online NewsHour with Jim Lehrer
 Stockholm International Peace Research Institute's data on world nuclear forces
 Nuclear Proliferation International History Project For more on the history of nuclear proliferation see the Woodrow Wilson Center's Nuclear Proliferation International History Project website.
 Proliferation Watch: US Intelligence Assessments of Potential Nuclear Powers, 1977–2001

Cold War
Nuclear weapons
Nuclear weapons policy
Nuclear proliferation
Nuclear technology-related lists